Hans Hulbækmo (born 1989) is a Norwegian musician (drums, percussion, saw, Jew's harp and vibraphone) and composer, son of the traditional folk musicians Tone Hulbækmo and Hans Fredrik Jacobsen, brother of  pianist Alf Hulbækmo,   and known from several Norwegian bands as Broen, Hanna Paulsberg Concept, Skadedyr, Moskus, Atomic, Kalenda Maya and his collaboration with Anders Røine.

Career 
Hulbækmo studied music on the Jazz program at Trondheim Musikkonsevatorium, NTNU, where he joined the acoustic jazz band "Moskus" together with fellow students, Fredrik Luhr Dietrichson (double bass) from Haugesund and Anja Lauvdal (piano) from Flekkefjord, at NTNU. Their debut album was Salmesykkel (2012) Hulbækmo also played in "Your Headlights Are On" with an selftiteled debut album Your Headlights Are On (2011) and "Snøskred" debuting with the album Whiteout (2012), with Anja Lauvdal.

In 2014, Hulbækmo joined the group Atomic, replacing founding percussionist Paal Nilssen-Love.

In 2015, he released the album "Yoga" with the band Broen.

Honors 
2011: Grappas Debutantpris, with "Moskus"
2011: Young Nordic Jazz Comets, with "Hanna Paulsberg Concept"
2011: Trondheim Jazz Festivals Talent Price, with "Hanna Paulsberg Concept"

Discography 

 Broen
2013: Broen/Invader Ace: The split jump drug EP (10" EP) (Kakao Musikk)
2015: Yoga''' (LP) (Nabovarsel)
2017: I <3 Art (Su Tissue)

 Moskus
2012: Salmesykkel (Hubro)
2014: Mestertyven (Hubro)
2016: Ulv Ulv (Hubro)
2018: Mirakler (Hubro)

 Hanna Paulsberg Concept
2012: Waltz For Lilli (Øra Fonogram)
2014: Song For Josia (Øra Fonogram)
2016: Eastern Smiles (Odin)

 Skadedyr
2013: Kongekrabbe (Hubro)
2016: Culturen (Hubro)
2018: Musikk! (Hubro)

 Atomic
2015: Lucidity (Jazzland)
2017: Six Easy Pieces (Odin)

 Anders Røine
2016: Kristine Valdresdatter (Ta:lik)

 Your Headlights Are On
2011: Your Headlights Are On (Dayladore Collective)

 Oluf Dimitri Røe
2011: Meltemi – wind of Mykonos (Etnisk Musikklubb)

 Hans Fredrik Jacobsen
2013: Trå dansen (Grappa)

 Tone Hulbækmo
2016: Stifinner (Grappa)

 Snøskred
2012: We are (7" single) (Riot Factory, Sad songs for happy people)
2012: Whiteout (Riot Factory, Sad songs for happy people)

 Therese Aune
2012: Billowing Shadows Flickering Light (Riot Factory)

 Sommerfuglfisk
2013:  The Guest House'' (Bergland Productions)

References

External links
Moskustrio official Website

21st-century Norwegian drummers
Norwegian jazz drummers
Male drummers
Norwegian jazz vibraphonists
Norwegian jazz composers
Male jazz composers
Musicians from Tolga, Norway
Norwegian University of Science and Technology alumni
1989 births
Living people
21st-century Norwegian male musicians
Atomic (band) members